Cristina Fallarás (Zaragoza, 1968) is a Spanish journalist. She gained a little relevance when publicly admitting to having been evicted from her house.

She studied Information science at the Autonomous University of Barcelona and has worked as a journalist for Cadena Ser, El Mundo, El Periódico de Catalunya, RNE (Ràdio4) and the journal ADN.

In 2012, she was awarded the Premio Hammett, a prize awarded by the International Association of Crime Writers for the best crime novel written in Spanish,  for her novel Las niñas perdidas (Lost Girls), published by Roca Editorial.

Bibliography
 La otra Enciclopedia Catalana, Belacqua, 2002
 Rupturas, Urano, 2003
 No acaba la noche, Planeta, 2006
 Así murió el poeta Guadalupe, Alianza, 2009
 Las niñas perdidas, Roca Editorial, 2011
 Últimos días en el Puesto del Este, DVD ediciones, 2011
A la puta calle: Crónica de un desahucio, Bronce Editorial, 2013
Honrarás a tu padre y a tu madre, Anagrama, 2018
Ahora contamos nosotras, Anagrama, 2019
Posibilidad de un nido, Esto No Es Berlín, 2020
El evangelio según María Magdalena, Penguin Random House, 2021

References

1968 births
Living people
People from Zaragoza
Spanish journalists
Autonomous University of Barcelona alumni
El Mundo (Spain) people